William Earl Kidd (born November 16, 1952) is an American politician. He is a member of the Missouri House of Representatives, having served since 2015. He is a member of the Republican Party.

Electoral history

State representative

References

Living people
Republican Party members of the Missouri House of Representatives
Politicians from Independence, Missouri
1952 births
21st-century American politicians